History Lessons is a 1972 West German drama film directed by Danièle Huillet and Jean-Marie Straub.

Cast
 Gottfried Bold as Mumilius Spicer
 Henri Ludwig
 Johann Unterpertinger as Peasant

References

External links

1972 films
1972 drama films
1970s avant-garde and experimental films
West German films
1970s German-language films
Films based on works by Bertolt Brecht
Films directed by Jean-Marie Straub and Danièle Huillet
German avant-garde and experimental films
1970s German films